Kseniya Grigoreva (born 25 November 1987) is an alpine skier from Uzbekistan.  She competed for Uzbekistan at the 2010 Winter Olympics.  Her best result was a 58th place in the giant slalom.

References

External links
 
 

1987 births
Living people
Uzbekistani female alpine skiers
Olympic alpine skiers of Uzbekistan
Alpine skiers at the 2010 Winter Olympics
Alpine skiers at the 2014 Winter Olympics
Alpine skiers at the 2007 Asian Winter Games
Alpine skiers at the 2011 Asian Winter Games
21st-century Uzbekistani women